Italian destroyer Espero was one of eight s built for the  (Royal Italian Navy) during the 1920s. She was named after a westerly wind, Espero, or Ponente, common in summer in the Mediterranean.  Completed in 1928, Espero was sent to Shanghai after the Shanghai Incident on 28 January 1932. After encountering heavy seas, she had to stop at Saigon, French Indochina, then stayed in the Far East even after a truce had been negotiated between China and Japan.

After Italy entered World War II on 10 June 1940, Espero was part of the 2nd Destroyer Squadron, based at Taranto. Only seventeen days after Italy's entry into the war, Espero was sunk during the Battle of the Espero Convoy as she covered the convoy's retreat, the first surface engagement between Allied and Italian warships. The ship was the first Italian destroyer to be lost in World War II.

Design and description
The Turbine-class destroyers were enlarged and improved versions of the preceding  s. Their complement was 12 officers and 167 enlisted men.

The Turbines were powered by two Parsons geared steam turbines, each driving one propeller shaft using steam supplied by three Thornycroft boilers.

Their main battery consisted of four  guns in two twin-gun turrets, one each fore and aft of the superstructure. Anti-aircraft (AA) defense for the Turbine-class ships was provided by a pair of  AA guns in single mounts amidships and a twin-gun mount for  machine guns. They were equipped with six  torpedo tubes in two triple mounts amidships. The Turbines could carry 52 mines.

Construction and career

Espero was laid down by Gio. Ansaldo & C. at their Genoa-Sestri Ponente shipyard on 29 April 1925, launched on 31 August 1927 and commissioned on 30 April 1928.

After the Shanghai Incident of January 1932 which led to hostilities between China and Japan, Italy decided to send two warships and the San Marco Battalion to protect their colony in Shanghai.  and Espero were selected for the mission. Both vessels departed from Gaeta on 5 February 1932 under command of Admiral Domenico Cavagnari. Trento reached Shanghai on 4 March, while Espero, slowed down by rough weather, had to stop at Saigon before reaching China three days later. After a truce was negotiated between Japan and China, Trento left Shanghai on 14 May 1932 for the return journey to Italy, while Espero stayed behind for a year to complement and strengthen Italian naval squadron in the Far East. In 1934  Espero, along with Ostro, Zeffiro and Borea formed the 4th Destroyer Squadron, part of the 2nd Naval Division.

World War II
At the time of Italy's entrance into World War II on 10 June 1940, Espero together with sister ships ,  and  formed 2nd Destroyer Squadron based at Taranto.

Battle of the Espero Convoy

On 27 June 1940 Espero, commanded by Captain Enrico Baroni, sailed from Taranto at 22:45 for the first war mission, along with Ostro and Zeffiro. The three vessels were to transport to Tobruk two light anti-aircraft batteries,  of ammunition (450,000 rounds) and 162 members of the Voluntary Militia for National Security.

The Italian destroyers were theoretically faster than the British cruisers, but due to their age and heavy cargo on board their speed advantage was nullified. In addition, Espero'''s third boiler turned out to be defective, limiting the destroyer's speed to just . Captain Baroni, therefore, decided to sacrifice his ship in order to cover the escape of Zeffiro and Ostro, and ordered them to disengage and sail for Benghazi at full speed. Espero laid smokescreens and conducted evasive maneuvers, engaging Liverpool's division with guns, and simultaneously firing three torpedoes at Orion. While Liverpool and Gloucester took on Espero, the other three cruisers tried to get around the smokescreens to attack the fleeing Ostro and Zeffiro, but were ordered to abandon their pursuit and concentrate on Espero instead. In fact, Italians drew first blood, when a single Italian  shell hit Liverpool just 3 ft above the waterline, with splinters penetrating the warheads of two torpedoes, but caused little damage otherwise. Despite heavy firing, Espero was not hit until 20:00, when her engine rooms were struck bringing the vessel to a stop. The 7th Squadron expended about 5,000 shells, more than 1,600 of main caliber, before the Italian destroyer was sunk, after 130 minutes of fierce fighting. Sydney'' rescued 47 out of 225 men from the Italian destroyer, and thirty six more escaped on rafts, but only six of them were later found alive by Italian submarine  almost 20 days later. Captain Baroni died aboard his ship, and was posthumously awarded the Medaglia d´oro al valor militare.

Notes

Bibliography

External links
 Espero (1927) Marina Militare website

Turbine-class destroyers
World War II destroyers of Italy
1927 ships
Ships built by Gio. Ansaldo & C.
Ships built in Genoa
Maritime incidents in June 1940
World War II shipwrecks in the Mediterranean Sea